

Belgium
 Belgian Congo – Théophile Wahis, Governor-General of the Belgian Congo (1908–1912)

France
 French Somaliland –
 Pierre Hubert Auguste Pascal, Governor of French Somaliland (1909–1911)
 Jean-Baptiste Castaing, acting Governor of French Somaliland (1911)
 Pierre Hubert Auguste Pascal, Governor of French Somaliland (1911–1915)
 Guinea – Camille Guy, Lieutenant-Governor of Guinea (1910–1912)

Japan
 Karafuto – Hiraoka Teitarō, Governor-General of Karafuto (12 June 1908 – 5 June 1914)
 Korea – Terauchi Masatake, Governor-General of Korea (1910–1916)
 Taiwan – Sakuma Samata, Governor-General of Taiwan (15 April 1906 – May 1915)

Portugal
 Angola –
 Caetano Francisco Cláudio Eugénio Gonçalves, Governor-General of Angola (1910–1911)
 Manuel Maria Coelho, Governor-General of Angola (1911–1912)

United Kingdom
 Barotziland-North-Western Rhodesia
 Lawrence Aubrey Wallace, Administrator of Barotziland-North-Western Rhodesia (1909–1911)
 United with North-Eastern Rhodesia to form Northern Rhodesia, 17 August
 Bechuanaland
High Commissioner - Viscount Gladstone, High Commissioner for Southern Africa (1910–1914)
Resident Commissioner - Francis William Panzera, Resident Commissioner of Bechuanaland (1906–1916)
 Malta Colony – Leslie Rundle, Governor of Malta (1909–1915)
 Northern Rhodesia
 North-Eastern Rhodesia and Barotziland-North-Western Rhodesia united as Northern Rhodesia, 17 August
 Hugh Charlie Marshall, acting Administrator of Northern Rhodesia (1911)
 Lawrence Aubrey Wallace, Administrator of Northern Rhodesia (1911–1921)
 North-Eastern Rhodesia
 Leicester Paul Beaufort, Administrator of North-Eastern Rhodesia (1909–1911)
 Hugh Charlie Marshall, acting Administrator of North-Eastern Rhodesia (1911)
 United with Barotziland-North-Western Rhodesia to form Northern Rhodesia, 17 August

United States
 Hawaii - Walter F. Frear (1907–1913), Territorial Governor of Hawaii

Colonial governors
Colonial governors
1911